Route 153 is a highway in southeastern Missouri, United States.  Its northern terminus is at U.S. Route 60 midway between Sikeston and Dexter.  Its southern terminus is at Route 25 north of Kennett.

Major intersections

References

153
Transportation in New Madrid County, Missouri
Transportation in Stoddard County, Missouri